{{DISPLAYTITLE:C20H22O3}}
The molecular formula C20H22O3 (molar mass: 310.39 g/mol, exact mass: 310.1569 u) may refer to:

 Avobenzone
 Nafenopin